Maigret at the Gai-Moulin (French: La Danseuse du Gai-Moulin) is a detective novel by the Belgian writer Georges Simenon.

Synopsis
Jean Chabot and René Delfrosse plan to hide in the cellar and rob the till at the Liege nightclub, Gai-Moulin. After the nightclub closes for the night, they venture out of the cellar and stumble on the body of a Greek man. Frightened and in shock they run away from the nightclub. Jean, who has been taking money from the petty cash at the office where he works, needs to return the money before the books are closed and so René steals cash from the till at his uncle's chocolate shop. When they find that they are being followed, they decide to throw the money down the toilet but Jean is arrested before he can do that. He insists he is innocent but the stories of Adèle, a dancer at the Gai-Moulin, Victor, a waiter at the Gai-Moulin, and Gennaro, the proprietor all seem to point at the guilt of the two boys. However, some suspicion also centers on a Frenchman who arrived in Leige on the same train, was staying at the same hotel as the murdered man, and who was at the Gai-Moulin at the same time. Inspector Delvigne does not know what to think when Maigret makes a surprising appearance on the scene.

Publication history
La Danseuse du Gai-Moulin was first published by Fayard in November 1931. Simenon, known to be a fast writer, is said to have penned the entire book in 25 hours.

The first English edition (published simultaneously in the UK and the United States) was published by George Routledge and Sons in 1940 in a two book volume entitled Maigret Abroad (along with A Crime in Holland) with the title At the Gai-Moulin. It was reissued in 1991 by Harcourt with its current English title. The book was translated from the French by Geoffrey Sainsbury.

Adaptations
A German language film version Maigret and His Greatest Case premiered on 24 November 1966 starring Heinz Rühmann as Maigret. 
A French TV version of this book aired on 29 August 1981 with Jean Richard playing Maigret.

References

1931 Belgian novels
Maigret novels
Novels set in Belgium
Belgian novels adapted into films